Icupima is a genus of longhorn beetles of the subfamily Lamiinae, containing the following species:

 Icupima ampliata Martins, Galileo & Tavakilian, 2008
 Icupima laevipennis (Gahan, 1892)
 Icupima taua Martins & Galileo, 2004

References

Hemilophini